505 Games S.p.A. is an Italian video game publisher based in Milan. It was founded in 2006 as a subsidiary of Milan-based Digital Bros.

History
505 Games was founded in 2006 in Milan as a subsidiary of Digital Bros. The company found its early success through its video games such as Cooking Mama and Zumba Fitness.

In April 2012, 505 Games took over publishing duties from THQ for the fitness game Adidas MiCoach, following a lawsuit between THQ and Adidas. In April 2013, they acquired the license of Drawn To Life series. The purchase included rights to the franchise as a whole. In November 2013, it canceled Ashes Cricket 2013 and issued refunds. In April 2014, 505 Games announced a publishing agreement with Adam Orth's Three One Zero of the game Adrift. The game is described as a first-person experience, where the player controls an astronaut exploring debris of a wrecked station in outer space. In January 2015, 505 Games confirmed the acquisition of the intellectual property (IP) rights to the multi-award-winning Game of the Year 2013, Brothers: A Tale of Two Sons from Starbreeze Studios. In April 2015, 505 Games announced a publishing agreement with Swedish game developer Starbreeze for the game Overkill's The Walking Dead, which released in late 2018. A month later, 505 Games announced a publishing agreement with game developer Overkill Software for the game Payday 2 Crimewave Edition. In August 2016, 505 Games announced it would be publishing Virginia from Variable State.

In March 2015, 505 Games purchased 2.67% stock of Swedish game developer Starbreeze Studios. In January 2016, 505 Games announced that they will shift their focus from publishing games for other developers to developing their own intellectual properties. In October 2016, 505 Games has announced through Koji Igarashi, their collaboration in publishing Bloodstained: Ritual of the Night from Igarashi's own ArtPlay, DICO and Inti Creates, though Inti's involvement has been reduced. At the Sony E3 press conference on 11 June 2018, 505 Games announced a partnership with Remedy Entertainment to publish Control.

505 Games acquired Australia-based Infinity Plus Two, the developers of the Puzzle Quest games in January 2021.

505 Games is working with Rabbit and Bear Studios to publish Eiyuden Chronicle: Hundred Heroes, a spiritual successor to the Suikoden series; the partnership officially announced February 2021.

On June 27, 2022, D3 Go! was acquired by 505 Games. The acquisition also included the intellectual property of the Puzzle Quest games.

Games published

Games published by 505 Games include Sniper Elite III, Payday 2, Assetto Corsa, Brothers: A Tale of Two Sons, Terraria, Redout, How to Survive, Defense Grid 2, Deep Black, Abzû, Adrift, Virginia, Dead by Daylight, Control, Unturned, Indivisible, and the PC release of Death Stranding.

Accolades
In April 2015, 505 Games was awarded the title of Best Indie Games Label at the MCV Awards.

References

External links
 

 
Companies based in Milan
Italian companies established in 2006
Video game companies established in 2006
Video game companies of Italy
Video game publishers